The 1938 Chicago Maroons football team was an American football team that represented the University of Chicago during the 1938 Big Ten Conference football season. In their sixth season under head coach Clark Shaughnessy, the Maroons compiled a 1–6–1 record (0–4 against conference opponents), finished in last place in the Big Ten Conference, and were outscored by opponents by a combined total of 241 to 75.

Schedule

References

Chicago
Chicago Maroons football seasons
Chicago Maroons football